Messe station is a Nuremberg U-Bahn station, located on the U1 line in Nuremberg, Germany.

The station was featured in the 2011 Joe Wright film "Hanna". The title characters father, played by Eric Bana, is seen leaving the nearby bus station, entering the U-Bahn and then fighting several CIA agents.

References

Nuremberg U-Bahn stations
Railway stations in Germany opened in 1972
1972 establishments in West Germany